Pastime is a 1990 American sports drama film directed by Robin B. Armstrong and written by David Eyre Jr. The film stars William Russ, Glenn Plummer, Noble Willingham, Jeffrey Tambor, and Scott Plank. The film was released on August 23, 1991, by Miramax Films.

Plot
In 1957, a California low-level minor-league baseball team called the Steamers has a pitcher way beyond his prime, 41-year-old Roy Dean Bream, who reminisces about his brief "cup of coffee" in the Major Leagues and how the great Stan Musial once hit a grand slam home run against him.

New to the team is 17-year-old Tyron Debray, a fireballing pitcher Bream immediately takes under his wing. Because one is old, talkative and white and the other young, quiet and black, various tensions materialize on the team, many of them instigated by Randy Keever, a bad-tempered bully who is another of the team's pitchers.

Bream is keeping a secret as he goes through what is likely to be his final season, a heart condition for which he is taking medication. His dream is to see young Debray succeed and to get one last chance himself before giving up America's "national pastime," baseball, once and for all.

Cast

Reception
On review aggregator website Rotten Tomatoes, the film has a 44% approval rating based on 9 reviews, with an average ranking of 5.7/10.

Owen Gleiberman of Entertainment Weekly gave the film a score of "C+", while Marjorie Baumgarten of The Austin Chronicle gave the film a 1 star out of 5. Under the title One Cup of Coffee, it won the audience award at the Sundance Film Festival.

References

External links

1990s sports drama films
American baseball films
American sports drama films
Films scored by Lee Holdridge
Films set in 1957
Films set in California
Miramax films
1990 directorial debut films
1990 drama films
1990s English-language films
1990s American films